Fodina afflicta is a moth in the family Noctuidae. It is found in Madagascar.

The male of this species has a wingspan of 30 mm. The holotype was found in the Ankaratra massif in an altitude of 1850 m.

References

Moths described in 1959
Calpinae
Moths of Madagascar
Moths of Africa